Lisztomania is the first soundtrack album by English keyboardist Rick Wakeman. It was released in November 1975 by A&M Records as the soundtrack for the Ken Russell's musical biographical film Lisztomania about the Hungarian composer Franz Liszt. Some tracks feature The Who's Roger Daltrey singing lead vocals.

The album was later upgraded as The Real Lisztomania by Wakeman because he was dissatisfied with the original release.

Background
By 1975, Wakeman had established himself as the former Yes keyboardist and a successful solo artist with three rock concept albums: The Six Wives of Henry VIII (1973), Journey to the Centre of the Earth (1974), and The Myths and Legends of King Arthur and the Knights of the Round Table (1975). After Wakeman finished touring Journey to the Centre of the Earth in March 1975, he was asked to compose the score for Lisztomania, a contemporary biographical film of the Hungarian composer Franz Liszt directed by Ken Russell.

Wakeman recorded the album through 1975 during gaps between recording and live performances, and worked closely with Russell on the score. Once Russell knew exactly what music was going to be used, he gave Wakeman artistic freedom to record what he wanted. Initially Wakeman considered the record "a bonus soundtrack", but after writing and recording the music for it, he was "very happy" with the results and regarded it as his "next official album". An initial cut and master was produced by Wakeman which his label, A&M Records, declared unsatisfactory. This complicated matters further between Wakeman and A&M, as the two parties had disagreed over aspects of his earlier solo albums. In August 1975, after the album had been recorded, Wakeman said he was pleased with the music, but had no control over what tracks were to be included on the album. The situation culminated in A&M producing a cut featuring less of the music Wakeman had written and recorded without his approval which, upon hearing what the label had selected for release, annoyed him greatly.

Release and reception

When Allmusic rated the album they said "The soundtrack to Ken Russell's movie provided Wakeman with a canvas upon which to work his magic (or do his damage—it depends upon one's attitude) upon the music of Franz Liszt and, to a lesser degree, Richard Wagner. Actually, much of what is here is more substantial than the material on Journey or Myths and Legends, which can be attributed largely to the composers' contributions." Wakeman himself has written on his website that "this album stinks".

Excerpts from the album were performed live on Wakeman's tour of North America and Brazil in late 1975.

Track listing

Personnel
Musicians
Rick Wakeman – keyboards
David Wilde – piano (Liszt music)
Roger Daltrey – vocals on "Love's Dream", "Orpheus Song", "Funerailles", "Peace at Last"
Linda Lewis – vocals on "Hell"
Paul Nicholas – vocals on "Excelsior Song"
National Philharmonic Orchestra
George Michie
John Forsythe
The English Rock Ensemble

Production
Rick Wakeman – production, arrangements
Bill Curbishley – executive production
Brian Lane – executive production
Roland Young – art direction
Junie Osaki – design
Mixed at Island Studios and Olympic Studios, London

Charts

References

Rick Wakeman albums
Film soundtracks
1975 soundtrack albums
A&M Records soundtracks
Cultural depictions of Franz Liszt
Roger Daltrey albums